Macopaeus is a genus of jumping spiders endemic to Madagascar. It contains only one species, Macopaeus spinosus. Two other species (M. celebensis Merian, 1911 and M. madagascarensis Peckham & Peckham, 1903) were described in this genus in the early 20th century. However, these were transferred to the genus Brettus in 1980.

Footnotes

References
  (2007): The world spider catalog, version 8.0. American Museum of Natural History.

Further reading
  (1980): A revision of the spider genus Macopaeus (Araneae: Salticidae). Bull. Br. Mus. nat. Hist. (Zool.) 38: 219-223.

External links
 Salticidae.org: Diagnostic drawings

Salticidae
Monotypic Salticidae genera
Endemic fauna of Madagascar
Spiders of Madagascar